Suspended Animation is the fourth studio album by American supergroup Fantômas. It is a concept album that incorporates a dual theme of cartoon sounds/music as well as paying tribute to obscure and dubious holidays throughout the month of April.

Release 
The limited edition disc is a spiral bound April 2005 mini calendar featuring vivid imagery by Yoshitomo Nara. The disc sleeve is marked with "This calendar belongs to: .......... Your name". The limited edition of the album was released on April 5, 2005, while the regular version was released on June 14, 2005.

Reception 

Pitchfork wrote "the album still suffers from the same flaws that hampered Delirium Cordia. With the average track spanning less than 90 seconds, musical ideas either bleed from one song to the next or don't sustain themselves long enough to register in the listener's head."

Track listing
"04/01/05 April Fool's Day" – 0:35
"04/02/05 International Children's Book Day (USA) Battle of the Flowers (France) National Peanut Butter and Jelly Day (USA)" – 2:10
"04/03/05 Megalisia (Roman) Don't Go to Work Unless It's Fun Day (USA)" – 1:46
"04/04/05 Er Tong Jie Children's Day (Taiwan) A Drop of Water Is a Grain of Gold Day (Turkmenistan)" – 1:33
"04/05/05 Festival of the Sweeping of the Tombs (China)" – 0:34
"04/06/05 Sorry Charlie Day (USA) Plan Your Epitaph Day (USA)" – 2:25
"04/07/05 Motherhood and Beauty Day (Armenia) No Housework Day (USA)" – 1:09
"04/08/05 Moharram (India) Hana Matsuri Flower Festival (Japan)" – 1:09
"04/09/05 Day of the Amazon Goddess (Brazil)" – 1:17
"04/10/05 Soul Sunday (Haitian Vodou) Feast of the Rivers and Seas (Egypt, Sumerian)" – 2:20
"04/11/05 Eight Track Tape Day (USA)" – 2:17
"04/12/05 Cosmonauts Day (Russia) Walk on Your Wild Side Day (USA) Feast of the Blajini (Romania)" – 1:16
"04/13/05 Blame Somebody Else Day (USA) Vaisakhi Solar Year (Hindu)" – 1:31
"04/14/05 Youth Day (Angola) International Moment of Laughter Day (USA)" – 2:21
"04/15/05 That Sucks' Day (USA) Day of the Sun (North Korea)" – 0:40
"04/16/05 Rekindle Your Romantic Self Day (USA)" – 0:49
"04/17/05 National Cheeseball Day (USA) "Blah Blah Blah" Day (USA)" – 0:46
"04/18/05 Week of the Young Child (USA) Depression Day -Anime Calendar (Japan)" – 0:47
"04/19/05 Binding Tuesday (UK) Garlic Day (USA)" – 0:40
"04/20/05 Taurus the Bull (Astrological Calendar) National Puppetry Day (USA)" – 1:49
"04/21/05 Kindergarten Day (Germany) Prophet's Birthday (Islamic)" – 1:40
"04/22/05 Feast of Ishtar (Babylonian) Girl Scout Leader Day (USA)" – 2:05
"04/23/05 Çocuk Bayrami (Turkey) Lover's Day (USA) Festival of the Green Man (Witches Calendar)" – 0:59
"04/24/05 National Karaoke Week (USA) Children's Day (Iceland)" – 1:49
"04/25/05 Cuckoo Day (UK) National Playground Safety Week (USA)" – 0:31
"04/26/05 Flower Parade (Netherlands) Richter Scale Day (USA)" – 1:32
"04/27/05 National Scoop the Poop Day (USA)" – 1:13
"04/28/05 Floralia (Romania)" – 1:31
"04/29/05 Casse Canarie (Haitian Vodou)" – 1:29
"04/30/05 National Honesty Day (USA) Beltane (Celtic) Walpurgisnacht (Germany)" – 3:09

Personnel

Fantomas
Mike Patton – vocals, keyboards, samples, production, arrangement, layout
Dave Lombardo – drums, percussion, samples
Buzz Osborne – guitar, keyboards
Trevor Dunn – bass

Other personnel
Yoshitomo Nara – artwork
S. Husky Höskulds – engineering, mixing
Gene Grimaldi – mastering
Martin Kvamme – artwork, layout
Lady T – layout
Carl Stalling – sample source (uncredited)

Chart performance

References

External links 

 

Fantômas (band) albums
Ipecac Recordings albums
2005 albums
Concept albums
Sound collage albums